The Naro Moru River starts on Mount Kenya and flows down to the west, through Nyeri County, Kenya, into the Ewaso Ng'iro River. The North and South Naro Moru Rivers are fed by the Teleki Tarn, Lewis Glacier, Tyndall Tarn and Glacier, Hut Tarn and Darwin Glacier at the peaks of Mount Kenya. They join at 2,810 m (9,200 ft) above sea level. The catchment area of the Naro Moru River is around 83 km2.

References 

Rivers of Kenya
Mount Kenya
Nyeri County